Erik Nordström may refer to:

Erik Nordström (1818–1907), Swedish organ builder and repairer of church facades, see Sven and Erik Nordström
Erik Nordström, part of Swedish singing duo act Ansiktet
Erik Nordstrom, CEO of Nordstrom